James Allan (17 June 1866 – 4 November 1945) was a Scottish footballer, who played for Queen's Park and Scotland.

External links

London Hearts profile

1866 births
1945 deaths
Footballers from North Ayrshire
Association football forwards
Scottish footballers
Scotland international footballers
Queen's Park F.C. players
People from Kilwinning